Fury (Italian: Furia) is a 1947 Italian melodrama film directed by Goffredo Alessandrini and starring Isa Pola, Rossano Brazzi and Gino Cervi. The film was remade in 1957 as Wild Is the Wind, Anna Magnani's second Hollywood role. Loosely based on Giovanni Verga's novel La lupa, it is a melodrama set in the horsebreeding community.

Cast
 Isa Pola as Clara  
 Rossano Brazzi as Antonio 
 Gino Cervi as Oreste  
 Adriana Benetti as Marietta 
 Checco Durante as Postman 
 Paolo Ferrara as Doctor 
 Camillo Pilotto as Priest 
 Cesare Polacco as Lawyer 
 Umberto Spadaro as Rocco 
 Bella Starace Sainati as Priest's Sister 
 Attilio Torelli
 Pina Piovani
 Armando Guarnieri

References

Bibliography 
 Dick, Bernard F. Hal Wallis: Producer to the Stars. University Press of Kentucky, 2004.

External links 
 

1947 films
Italian drama films
1947 drama films
1940s Italian-language films
Films directed by Goffredo Alessandrini
Films set in Italy
Films based on Italian novels
Films based on works by Giovanni Verga
Italian black-and-white films
1940s Italian films